
Year 89 BC was a year of the pre-Julian Roman calendar. At the time it was known as the Year of the Consulship of Strabo and Cato (or, less frequently, year 665 Ab urbe condita) and the Fourth Year of Zhenghe. The denomination 89 BC for this year has been used since the early medieval period, when the Anno Domini calendar era became the prevalent method in Europe for naming years.

Events 
 By place 

 Roman Republic 
 Consuls: Gnaeus Pompeius Strabo and Lucius Porcius Cato.
 Social War:
 Roman forces under Lucius Porcius Cato are defeated by the Italian rebels in the Battle of Fucine Lake, Cato is killed.
 The Roman army of Gnaeus Pompeius Strabo decisively defeats the rebels in the Battle of Asculum.
 Lex Plautia Papiria extends citizenship to all Italians who applied for it within 60 days. The new citizens are enrolled in eight designated tribes, to prevent domination of the assemblies.
 Lex Pompeia grants Latin rights to cities in Cisalpine Gaul.
 Pompeii is annexed by the Roman Republic.
 Cicero ends his service in the Roman army.

 Asia Minor 
 Mithridates VI of Pontus invades Bithynia and Cappadocia, thus beginning the First Mithridatic War.

 Xiongnu 
 The former Han General-in-Chief Li Guangli, now the son-in-law of Hulugu Chanyu, is arrested and sacrificed to the gods to restore the health of Hulugu's mother.

Births 
 Empress Shangguan, wife to Emperor Zhao of Han (d. 37 BC)

Deaths 
 Aulus Sempronius Asellio, Roman praetor (murdered by creditors)
 Lucius Porcius Cato, Roman politician and general
 Marcus Aemilius Scaurus, Roman politician (b. c. 163 BC)
 Titus Didius, killed in battle during the Social War
 Li Guangli, Chinese General-in-Chief (Han Dynasty)

References